4Q119 (also 4QLXXLeva; TM 62293; LDAB 3454) designates the remnants of a Greek manuscript of the Book of Leviticus written on parchment. It was found at Qumran cave 4 and is dated to the 1st century BCE or 1st century CE. It got the no. 801 according to the system of Alfred Rahlfs. The manuscript is stored in Rockefeller Museum at Jerusalem (Mus. Inv. Gr. 1004).

Bibliography 
 Patrick Skehan, Eugene C. Ulrich, Judith E. Sanderson: 119. 4QLXXLeviticusa. Qumran Cave 4.IV (Discoveries in the Judaean Desert 9). Clarendon Press, Oxford 1992. , pp. 161–165, plate XXXVIII.

External links 
 

1st-century biblical manuscripts
1st-century BC biblical manuscripts
Dead Sea Scrolls
Septuagint manuscripts
Book of Leviticus